Persistent Systems is an Indian multinational technology services company which was incorporated on 16 May 1990. Persistent Systems is listed on the Bombay Stock Exchange and the National Stock Exchange.
Shares in the company were listed on the National Stock Exchange of India in March 2010.

Activities
The company organizes an annual hackathon called Semicolons for its employees. The company also organizes IBM's Call for Code hackathon at its Goa, Nagpur and Pune offices.

Collaborations and Acquisitions
 2022: Persistent Systems acquires Us-based company MediaAgility for nearly $72 million and launces new Google Cloud Business unit.
 2022: Persistent Systems acquires Data Glove and launches new Microsoft business unit with focus on Azure Cloud 
 2021: Persistent Systems acquires Software Corporation International and Fusion360 adding deep Payments solutions expertise 
 2021: Persistent Systems acquires assets of Shree Partners to bolster cloud and IT Management capabilities 
 2021: Persistent Systems acquires assets Sureline to bolster cloud migration capabilities 
 2020: Persistent Systems acquires CAPIOT to strengthen MuleSoft, TIBCO, and API-led integration capabilities 
 2019: Persistent Systems acquires experience to create Europe’s leading boutique Salesforce partner 
 2019: Persistent Systems Joins Siemens’ MindSphere Partner Program to Deliver Industrial IoT Services 
 2017: Persistent Systems Acquires PARX – Platinum Salesforce Consulting Partner in DACH Market
 2016: Persistent Systems Launches Specialized Engineering Services for IBM Watson IoT Platform
 2016: Persistent Systems and REACHNet to Demonstrate Innovative Research Specific Informatics Infrastructure at HIMSS 2016 Conference
 2016: Persistent acquires PRM Cloud Solutions - a Salesforce.com consulting partner, engaged in building digital experiences on Salesforce1 cloud platform.
 2016: Persistent product arm Accelerite purchases Citrix's products CloudPlatform (Based on Apache Cloud Stack) and CloudPortal Business manager
 2015: Persistent Systems completed the acquisition of the digital content management solutions business of US-based Akumina.
 2012: Persistent Systems Strengthens Product Maintenance & Support Business; Acquires Openwave’s Location Business
 2011: The operations of Nagpur-based Infospectrum India Private, an outsourced private development of US company Infospectrum, were taken over by Persistent in February 2011.

References

External links
 

Software companies of India
Indian companies established in 1990
Companies based in Pune
Indian brands
Technology companies of India
Software companies established in 1990
Technology companies established in 1990
1990 establishments in Maharashtra
Companies listed on the National Stock Exchange of India
Companies listed on the Bombay Stock Exchange